Jacob B. Agus (November 8, 1911 – September 26, 1986) was a Polish-born American liberal Conservative rabbi and theologian who played a key role in the Conservative Rabbinical Assembly.

Life 

Jacob Agus was a leading thinker of the Conservative movement's liberal wing, heading Rabbinical Assembly committees on the sabbath, prayerbook, and ideology of the Conservative movement. He was also a rabbi of Beth El Congregation in Baltimore, Maryland, and a promoter of interfaith communication, which he referred to as "dialogue" or "trialogue."

Agus (the family name was originally Agushewitz), was born in Poland in 1911 and his family emigrated to the United States in 1927. He attended the Talmudic Academy, New York, graduating in 1929, received his BA from Yeshiva College in 1933, and received semicha by Moshe Soloveichik at the Rabbi Isaac Elchanan Theological Seminary of Yeshiva University in 1935. In 1940 he received a PhD in Jewish Thought from Harvard University and married Miriam Shore the same year. His older brother was Irving A. Agus, who taught medieval Jewish History at Yeshiva University.

Agus's rabbinic career included Congregation Beth Abraham, Norfolk, Virginia, 1934–1936; Temple Ashkenaz, Cambridge, Massachusetts, 1936–1940; Agudas Achim North Shore Congregation, Chicago, 1940–1942; and Beth Abraham United Synagogue Center, Dayton, Ohio, 1942–1950. In 1945, Agus formally affiliated with the Conservative movement by joining the Rabbinical Assembly. In 1950 he became the rabbi of Beth El Congregation in Baltimore, where he remained for thirty years, retiring in 1980.

As a member of the Conservative movement's Rabbinical Assembly he was active in the Committee on Jewish Law and Standards, chaired the Prayer Book Committee (1952–1956) and worked to define Conservative Jewish ideology through a series of conferences, committees and other gatherings, including the Continuing Conference on Conservative Ideology (1956–1963). With Morris Adler and Theodore Friedman he co-authored the 1950 Responsum on the Sabbath that allowed Conservative Jews to drive to a synagogue on the Sabbath if there was none within walking distance.

He taught at the Reconstructionist Rabbinical College, St. Mary's Seminary and Ecumenical Institute (where he was also a founder of the Interfaith Roundtable), and at both Temple University and Dropsie College in Philadelphia.

In 1965 Agus accepted an invitation to teach at the Seminario Rabinico Latinoamerico in Buenos Aires. He remained in Argentina for two months, then traveled to Brazil where he spent two weeks lecturing under the auspices of the American Jewish Committee and the Brazilian Institute for Culture and Information. In Latin America Agus developed continuing ties with students and colleagues – among them Marshall Meyer, then director of the Seminario. These ties are documented by correspondence in this collection.

In addition to his rabbinical and scholarly work, Agus adopted the cause of interfaith and interracial relations, dubbing his forays into Jewish/Christian and Jewish/Christian/Muslim relations "dialogue" and "trialogue." He also served on the boards of the Baltimore National Council on Christians and Jews, and the predominantly African-American Morgan State University, also in Baltimore.

Professor Steven Katz described him as "a remarkable American Rabbi and scholar, illuminating Agus' commitment to Jewish people everywhere, his profound and unwavering spirituality, his continual reminders of the very real dangers of pseudo-Messianism and misplaced romantic zeal, and his willingness to take politically and religiously unpopular stands."

Interfaith

Agus was one of the principal theologians of the American Jewish-Christian dialogue. He developed a dual covenant theory based on the thought of Franz Rosenzweig. He envisioned a symbiosis of the two religions.

Rosenzweig’s view was remarkable, in that, the Christian community  was engaged in fulfilling Israel’s mission. The people Israel are like the sun; the Christian community was the effluence of Divine rays permeating the nations with the spirit of monotheism. The boundary line between Judaism and Christianity was not along the plane of intellectual thought, since the divine being could only be caught figuratively or symbolically within the meshes of human reason.

If the Bible is God-given, it follows that both Israel and Christendom, which are based on the Bible, are divinely ordained religious communities; in both these groups there is an eternal “we” which through common prayer for the Kingdom, acquires eternity for its members and also hastens the final redemption of the world….both are, in a real sense, revealed religions and each one, in itself, is only part of the truth.

Works 
 Modern Philosophies of Judaism (1941)
 Banner of Jerusalem  a biography of Abraham Isaac Kook, Chief Rabbi of Palestine in the 1930s.(1946)
 Guideposts in Modern Judaism (1954)
 The Evolution of Jewish Thought (1959)
 The Meaning of Jewish History (1963)
 The vision and the way; an interpretation of Jewish ethics
 Dialogue and Tradition : The Response of Judaism to the Major Challenges of the Contemporary World

References

Bibliography

 Katz, S.T. (1997) American Rabbi: The Life and Thought of Jacob B. Agus New York: New York University Press
 Katz, S.T. (1997) The Essential Agus: The Writings of Jacob B. Agus New York: New York University Press

American people of Polish-Jewish descent
Agus, Jacob B.
Agus, Jacob B.
Agus, Jacob B.
Agus, Jacob B.
Agus, Jacob B.
Rabbi Isaac Elchanan Theological Seminary semikhah recipients
Temple University faculty
Agus, Jacob B.
1911 births
1986 deaths
People from Svislach
Christian and Jewish interfaith dialogue
People in interfaith dialogue
20th-century American rabbis